Cole Jesse Smith (born April 5, 1989) is a Canadian professional mixed martial artist and former boxer in the Bantamweight division. A professional since 2016, he most notably competed in the UFC.

Background
Smith was born and raised in Squamish, British Columbia, Canada as the youngest of four brothers. He started training Brazilian jiu-jitsu at the age of 20.

Mixed martial arts career

Early career

Fighting out of Thailand, Smith made his debut in a regional Thailand organization, Thailand Ring Wars. Most of his pre-UFC career was spent in the BFL, Battlefield Fight League, based in British Columbia, Canada. He won the Bantamweight Championship and defended it twice before signing to the UFC in 2019.

Ultimate Fighting Championship 

Smith made his UFC debut as a late replacement for Brian Kelleher against Mitch Gagnon  on May 4, 2019, at UFC Fight Night 151. Smith won the fight by unanimous decision.

Smith faced Miles Johns on September 14, 2019, at UFC Fight Night: Cowboy vs. Gaethje. Smith lost a close fight by split decision.

Smith faced Hunter Azure on September 5, 2020, at UFC Fight Night: Overeem vs. Sakai. He lost via unanimous decision.

On December 4, 2020, it was announced that he was released from the UFC.

Post UFC 
Smith faced John Sweeney on April 2, 2022 at XMMA 4. He lost the fight via split decision.

Championships and achievements

Mixed martial arts 
 Battlefield Fight League
Battlefield Fight League Bantamweight Championship (Defended three times)

Mixed martial arts record

|-
| Loss
| align=center|7–3
| John Sweeney
| Decision (split)
| XMMA 4: Black Magic
| 
| align=center|3
| align=center|5:00
| New Orleans, Louisiana, United States
|
|-
| Loss
| align=center|7–2
| Hunter Azure
| Decision (unanimous)
| UFC Fight Night: Overeem vs. Sakai
| 
| align=center|3
| align=center|5:00
| Las Vegas, Nevada, United States
|
|-
| Loss
| align=center| 7–1
| Miles Johns
| Decision (split)
| UFC Fight Night: Cowboy vs. Gaethje
| 
| align=center|3
| align=center|5:00
| Vancouver, British Columbia, Canada
| 
|-
| Win
| align=center| 7–0
| Mitch Gagnon
| Decision (unanimous)
|UFC Fight Night: Iaquinta vs. Cowboy 
|
|align=center|3
|align=center|5:00
|Ottawa, Ontario, Canada
| 
|-
| Win
| align=center| 6–0
| Tyler Wilson
| Submission (rear-naked choke)
| BFL 59
| 
| align=center| 1
| align=center| 1:26
| Coquitlam, British Columbia, Canada
|  
|-
| Win
| align=center| 5–0
| Carlos Galvan
| Decision (unanimous)
| BFL 54
| 
| align=center|5
| align=center|5:00
| Coquitlam, British Columbia, Canada
| 
|-
| Win
| align=center| 4–0
| Tyler Dolby
| Submission (armbar)
| BFL 52
|  
| align=center| 1
| align=center| 3:13
| Vancouver, British Columbia, Canada
|
|-
| Win
| align=center| 3–0
| Reysaldo Trasmonte
| TKO (punches)
| Thailand Fighting Championship 2
| 
| align=center| 1
| align=center| N/A
| Khao Lak, Thailand
|
|-
| Win
| align=center|2–0
| Jamie Siraj
| Submission (rear-naked choke)
| BFL 46
| 
| align=center|4
| align=center|2:15
| Coquitlam, British Columbia, Canada
|
|-
| Win
| align=center| 1–0
| Komon Ninin
| TKO (punches)
| Thailand Ring Wars 3
| 
| align=center| 1
| align=center| 0:35
| Chiang Mai, Thailand
|
|-

Professional boxing record

See also
 List of male mixed martial artists

References

External links

1989 births
Living people
Canadian male mixed martial artists
Bantamweight mixed martial artists
Mixed martial artists utilizing taekwondo
Ultimate Fighting Championship male fighters
People from Squamish, British Columbia
Sportspeople from British Columbia
Canadian male boxers
Canadian male taekwondo practitioners
Canadian practitioners of Brazilian jiu-jitsu
People awarded a black belt in Brazilian jiu-jitsu